December 2009 Lower Dir mosque bombing was a suicide bombing just outside a mosque in the town of Timergara in Lower Dir District in Pakistan on Friday 18 December 2009.Police said that the bomber had tried to enter the mosque during afternoon prayers but didn't succeed due to security measures. He then blew up his explosives-packed vehicle near the gate of the mosque. At least 12 people were killed and 28 wounded in the attack.  Most of the dead were policemen who were leaving the mosque after Friday prayers. The mosque is adjacent to the district police headquarters.

See also
List of terrorist incidents in 2009
Terrorist incidents in Pakistan in 2009

References

2009 murders in Pakistan
2000s crimes in Khyber Pakhtunkhwa
21st-century mass murder in Pakistan
Mass murder in 2009
Massacres in religious buildings and structures
Mosque bombings in Pakistan
Suicide bombings in Khyber Pakhtunkhwa
Suicide car and truck bombings in Pakistan
Terrorist incidents in Pakistan in 2009
December 2009 crimes
December 2009 events in Pakistan